Smith Rock may refer to:
 Smith Rock State Park, a park in Central Oregon, U.S., famous for rock climbing
 Smith Rock Shelter, limestone overhang in McKinney Falls State Park near Austin, Texas, U.S.

See also 
 Smith Rocks (Antarctica)
 Will Smith-Chris Rock slapping incident (Smith-Rock slap)